Siliguri Mahila Mahavidyalaya, established in 1981, is the women's college in Siliguri. It offers undergraduate courses in arts. The campus is in the Darjeeling district. It is affiliated to  University of North Bengal.

Departments

Arts

Bengali 
English
History
Geography
Political Science
Philosophy
Economics
Education

Accreditation
The college is recognized by the University Grants Commission (UGC).

See also

References

External links
Siliguri Mahila Mahavidyalaya
University of North Bengal
University Grants Commission
National Assessment and Accreditation Council

Colleges affiliated to University of North Bengal
Educational institutions established in 1981
Universities and colleges in Darjeeling district
Women's universities and colleges in West Bengal
Education in Siliguri
1981 establishments in West Bengal